The following are the national records in athletics in Guinea maintained by Guinea's national athletics federation: Fédération Guinéenne d'Athlétisme (FGA).

Outdoor

Key to tables:

+ = en route to a longer distance

h = hand timing

A = affected by altitude

Mx = mixed race

y = denotes 880 yards

OT = oversized track (> 200m in circumference)

Men

Women

Indoor

Men

Women

References
General
World Athletics Statistic Handbook 2019: National Outdoor Records
World Athletics Statistic Handbook 2018: National Indoor Records
Specific

External links

Guinea
Records
Athletics